Louvação is the debut album by Gilberto Gil, released in 1967.

Track listing
 "Louvação" (Gil, Neto) - 3:45
 "Beira-Mar" (Gil, Caetano Veloso) - 3:54
 "Lunik 9" (Gil) - 3:04
 "Ensaio Geral" (Gil) - 1:57
 "Maria (Me Perdoe, Maria)" (Gil) - 2:37
 "A Rua" (Gil, Neto) - 3:33
 "Roda" (Augusto, Gil) - 2:41
 "Rancho da Rosa Encarnada" (Gil, Neto, Vandre) - 2:38
 "Viramundo" (Capinan, Gil) - 2:18
 "Mancada" (Gil) - 2:02
 "Água de Meninos" (Capinan, Gil) - 4:32
 "Procissão" (Gil) - 2:38
 "Minha Senhora" (Gil, Neto) - 3:24
 "A Moreninha" (Tom Zé) - 2:47

References 

Gilberto Gil albums
1967 debut albums
Bossa nova albums
Philips Records albums